Russell Bertram Sugarmon Jr. (May 11, 1929 – February 18, 2019) was an American politician and judge in the state of Tennessee.

Early life 
Sugarmon was born in Memphis, Tennessee to Russell and Lessye Hank Sugarmon. He grew up in South Memphis and attended Co-Operative Grammar School.

In 1946, Sugarmon graduated from Booker T. Washington High School when he was 15 years old.

Sugarman attended Morehouse College for one year. He received an A.B. in Political Science from Rutgers University in 1950. In 1953 he received a law degree Harvard Law School and attended  Boston University's Graduate School of Finance.

Career 
He practiced as an attorney in Memphis, Tennessee in the firm Ratner, Sugarmon, Lucas, Willis and Caldwell.

In 1959, Sugarmon ran for Public Works Commissioner, the first African-American in Memphis to run for a major city office. The outgoing commissioner, Henry Loeb, forced most of the other candidates to withdraw from the election, so as not to split the white vote among several candidates. Bill Farris, the only white man remaining on the ballot, won the post.

Sugarmon served in the Tennessee House of Representatives as a Democrat from the 11th District from 1967 to 1969.

Personal life 
From the mid-1950s to mid-1960s, he was married to the educator and activist Miriam DeCosta, with whom he had four children. Their son Tarik B. Sugarmon is a Memphis City Court judge who in 2014 ran for Memphis-Shelby County Juvenile Court. He died on February 18, 2019, aged 89.

Works and publications 
 Sugarmon, Russell B, and Hans-Thomas Ryan. Russell B. Sugarmon, Jr., Papers, 1959-1976: guide to the Papers. Memphis: Memphis State University, 1977. See also: Mississippi Valley Collection, Memphis State University.

See also 
 Civil Rights Movement

References 

1929 births
2019 deaths
Boston University School of Management alumni
Harvard Law School alumni
Democratic Party members of the Tennessee House of Representatives
Military personnel from Tennessee
Morehouse College alumni
Politicians from Memphis, Tennessee
Rutgers University alumni
Tennessee lawyers
20th-century American lawyers